Aminjikarai taluk is a taluk of the city district of Chennai in the Indian state of Tamil Nadu. It was formed in December 2013 from parts of the erstwhile Perambur-Purasawalkam taluk and the Egmore-Nungambakkam taluk. It comprises the neighbourhoods of Aminjikarai, Anna Nagar, Arumbakkam, Koyambedu, Thirumangalam, Vada Agaram and Villivakkam.

References

General
 Taluks of Chennai district

Specific

Taluks of Chennai district